Calpain-8 is a protein in humans that is encoded by the CAPN8 gene.

References

Further reading 

Human proteins